Lost Highway is a 1997 surrealist neo-noir psychological thriller horror film directed by David Lynch and co-written by Lynch and Barry Gifford. It stars Bill Pullman, Patricia Arquette, Balthazar Getty and Robert Blake in his final film role. The film follows a musician (Pullman) who begins receiving mysterious VHS tapes of him and his wife (Arquette) in their home. He is suddenly convicted of murder, after which he inexplicably disappears and is replaced by a young mechanic (Getty) leading a different life.

Lost Highway was financed by the French production company Ciby 2000 and was largely shot in Los Angeles, where Lynch collaborated with frequent producer Mary Sweeney and cinematographer Peter Deming. The film's surreal narrative structure has been likened to a Möbius strip, while Lynch has described it as a "psychogenic fugue" rather than a conventionally logical story. The film's soundtrack, which was produced by Trent Reznor, features an original score by Angelo Badalamenti and Barry Adamson, as well as contributions from artists including David Bowie, Marilyn Manson, Rammstein, Nine Inch Nails and The Smashing Pumpkins.

Upon release, Lost Highway received mixed reviews and grossed $3.7 million in North America after a modest three-week run. Most critics initially dismissed the film as incoherent, but it has since attracted a cult following and critical praise, as well as scholarly interest. Lost Highway is the first of three Lynch films set in Los Angeles, followed by Mulholland Drive in 2001 and Inland Empire in 2006. The film was adapted as an opera by the Austrian composer Olga Neuwirth in 2003.

Plot
Fred Madison, a Los Angeles saxophonist, receives a message on his house intercom: "Dick Laurent is dead." The next morning, his wife Renee finds a VHS tape on their porch containing a video of their house. After having sex, Fred tells her he had a dream about someone resembling her being attacked. He then sees Renee's face as that of a pale old man. Another tape arrives, showing shots of them asleep in their bed. Fred and Renee call the police but the detectives offer no assistance. 

Fred and Renee attend a party being thrown by her friend Andy. The Mystery Man that Fred dreamed about approaches Fred, claiming to have met him before. The man then says he is at Fred's house at that very moment and answers the house phone when Fred calls him. Fred learns from Andy that the man is a friend of Dick Laurent. Terrified, Fred leaves the party with Renee. The next morning, another tape arrives and Fred watches it alone. To his horror, it shows him hovering over Renee's dismembered body. He is sentenced to death for her murder.

While on death row, Fred is plagued by headaches and visions of the Mystery Man and a burning cabin in the desert. During a cell check, the prison guard finds that the man in Fred's cell is now Pete Dayton, a young auto mechanic. Although Pete is released into the care of his parents, he is followed by two detectives who are trying to uncover more about him. The next day, Pete returns to work at the garage where gangster Mr. Eddy asks him to repair his car. Mr. Eddy takes Pete for a drive, during which Pete witnesses Mr. Eddy beat down a tailgater. 

The next day, Mr. Eddy returns to the garage with his mistress, Alice Wakefield, and his Cadillac for Pete to repair. Later, Alice returns to the garage alone and invites Pete out for dinner. When Pete and Alice begin an affair, she fears that Mr. Eddy suspects them, and concocts a scheme to rob her friend Andy and leave town. Alice also reveals to Pete that Mr. Eddy is actually an amateur porn producer named Dick Laurent. Pete receives a phone call from Mr. Eddy and the Mystery Man, which frightens Pete so much that he decides to go along with Alice's plan. Pete ambushes Andy and accidentally kills him, before he notices a photograph depicting Alice and Renee together. Later, when the police are at the house investigating Andy's death, Alice is inexplicably missing from the photo.

Pete and Alice arrive at an empty cabin in the desert and start having sex outside on the sand. Alice taunts Pete and enters the cabin while Pete turns back into Fred. Fred searches the cabin and finds only the Mystery Man, who tells him that there is no Alice, only Renee, and starts chasing him with a video camera. Fred escapes and drives to the Lost Highway Hotel, where he finds Mr. Eddy and Renee having sex. 

After Renee leaves, Fred kidnaps Mr. Eddy and slits his throat. The Mystery Man shoots Mr. Eddy dead and then whispers something to Fred before he disappears. Fred drives to his old house, buzzes the intercom and says, "Dick Laurent is dead." When the two detectives drive up to the house, Fred runs back to his car and drives off with the detectives in pursuit. He leads the police on a high-speed chase through the desert, begins screaming helplessly amid flashes of light, and then falls silent as headlights trace the darkened highway.

Cast

Production

Development

Lost Highway was directed by David Lynch as his first feature film since Twin Peaks: Fire Walk with Me (1992), a prequel to his television series Twin Peaks (1990-1991). He came across the phrase "lost highway" in the book Night People (1992) by Barry Gifford. Because Lynch knew the writer very well and had previously adapted his novel Wild at Heart (1990) into a film by the same name, he told him that he loved the phrase as a title for a movie. The two agreed to write a screenplay together, having their own different ideas of what Lost Highway should be. They ended up rejecting all of them. Lynch then told Gifford that, during the last night of shooting Fire Walk with Me, he had a thought about videotapes and a couple in crisis. This idea would develop into the first part of the film until Fred Madison is put on death row. Lynch and Gifford then realized that a transformation had to occur and another story, which would have several links to the first one but also differ, developed. It took them one month to finish the script.

Lost Highway was partially inspired by the O. J. Simpson murder case and Simpson's ability to lead his life afterward. The film's opening scene, where Fred Madison hears the words "Dick Laurent is dead" over his intercom, was inspired by an analogous incident that happened to Lynch at his own house. Because his house was next to actor David Lander's house and both men have the same first name, Lynch thought the stranger must have been wrong about the address. The idea of The Mystery Man "came out of a feeling of a man who, whether real or not, gave the impression that he was supernatural", Lynch explained. The film was financed by the French production company Ciby 2000. Lynch's Asymmetrical Productions, whose offices are near his house in the Hollywood Hills, was also involved in the film's production.

Casting
Lynch cast Bill Pullman, a friend and neighbor of his, as the film's central character. Actress Patricia Arquette agreed to be cast as Renee and Alice because she was interested in portraying a sexually desirable and dangerous woman, a role she had never done before. She had also been a fan of Lynch for a long time and felt that it would be an honor to work with him. Actor Balthazar Getty was chosen for the role of Pete Dayton after Lynch saw a picture of him in a magazine and said that he was "the guy for the job". Because the script was so open to interpretation, Getty and Arquette did not know what kind of film Lost Highway was supposed to be. According to Getty, "Part of David's technique is to keep his actors guessing, because it creates a certain atmosphere on set."

Actor Robert Blake was cast as The Mystery Man because Lynch liked his previous work and was always interested in working with him. Although Blake did not understand the script at all, he was responsible for the look and style of his character. When Lynch told him to use his imagination, Blake decided to cut his hair short, part it in the middle, and apply white Kabuki make-up on his face. He then put on a black outfit and approached Lynch, who loved what he had done. Actor Robert Loggia, who had previously expressed interest in playing the role of Frank Booth in Lynch's 1986 mystery film Blue Velvet, was cast as Mr. Eddy and Dick Laurent. Lynch recalled that, upon learning of Dennis Hopper's casting as Booth, Loggia launched a profanity-laden rant at him, which would eventually become Mr. Eddy's road rage scene. Lost Highway also features the final motion picture performance of Richard Pryor.

Filming and editing

Lost Highway was shot in Los Angeles, California, in about 54 days, from November 29, 1995, to February 22, 1996. Some of the film's exterior and driving scenes were shot in Griffith Park, while the scenes of the Lost Highway Hotel were filmed at the Amargosa Opera House and Hotel in Death Valley. Lynch owns the property that was used for Fred and Renee's mansion, which is located on the same street as his own house in the Hollywood Hills. The house was configured in a particular way to meet the requirements of the film. A corridor that leads to the bedroom was added and the façade was remodeled with slot windows to make Fred's point of view very limited. The paintings that are on the wall above the couch were done by Lynch's ex-wife and producer Mary Sweeney.

The scenes that involved nudity and sexual contact proved to be very difficult for Arquette because she considers herself a very modest and shy person. Nevertheless, she felt very protected by Lynch and the film crew, who would always give her robes at any time. The love scene between her and Getty in the desert, which was shot on a dry lake bed 20 miles outside Baker, was a closed set and only key crew were allowed on it. The sequence where Fred transforms into Pete was not computer-generated, but rather accomplished with in-camera techniques: a makeup expert constructed a fake head that was covered with artificial brain matter, which was then intercut with shots of Pullman. The final car chase was shot with two different cameras running at different frame rates. The footage was then sped up to make the scene more aggressive.

Lynch worked with cinematographer Peter Deming to give the film a surreal look. Because the script did not include many descriptions, the film's visual approach evolved as filming progressed. Deming would occasionally pull out the lenses of his camera to defocus a particular scene, while Lynch would often listen to music in his headset and to a scene at the same time to visualize the screenplay. According to him, "Sound and picture working together is what films are [...] So every single sound has to be supporting that scene and enlarging it. A room is, say, nine by twelve, but when you're introducing sound to it, you can create a space that's giant". The notion of a psychogenic fugue was incorporated into the film after the unit publicist read it up on a book about mental illnesses. Lynch felt it was a musical term, stating that "a fugue starts off one way, takes up on another direction, and then comes back to the original, so it [relates] to the form of the film."

Originally, Lynch wanted to shoot Lost Highway in black and white, but the idea was discarded due to the financial risks it could cause. Nevertheless, the film was shot in varying levels of darkness and features few daylight scenes. Some sequences became so dark that it was difficult for viewers to see what was happening. According to Deming, "The thing I wanted to achieve was giving the feeling that anything could come out of the background, and to leave a certain question about what you're looking at. The film is working under the surface while you're watching it." The film's darkness was intentionally not adjusted during post-production. The first cut of the film ran two and a half hours, and a test audience of 50 people was given a preview to give Lynch an idea of what needed to be cut. The film was ultimately cut down to two hours and ten minutes. Most of the deleted scenes were about Pete's life, including a scene where Pete would go out with his friends to a drive-in before going to the bowling alley.

Soundtrack

The film's original score was composed by Angelo Badalamenti with additional music by Barry Adamson. Badalamenti had previously worked with Lynch on Blue Velvet and Twin Peaks. Although most of the score was recorded in Prague, additional compositions were done in London. In New Orleans, Lynch collaborated with musician Trent Reznor of Nine Inch Nails to provide additional music. Together, they created music that accompanied the scenes in which Fred and Renee watch the mysterious VHS tapes. Two songs by Reznor and Nine Inch Nails, "The Perfect Drug" and "Driver Down", were specifically composed for the film. Reznor then produced a soundtrack album that includes the film's score and songs by artists such as David Bowie, Lou Reed, Marilyn Manson, The Smashing Pumpkins, and Rammstein.

Marilyn Manson's contributions include their cover of Screamin' Jay Hawkins' "I Put a Spell on You", which was previously released on their 1995 EP Smells Like Children, and "Apple of Sodom", which was specifically written for the film. The Smashing Pumpkins' frontman Billy Corgan wrote "Eye" after Lynch rejected an early version of "Tear" from the band's 1998 album Adore. Two songs by Rammstein—"Rammstein" and "Heirate Mich"—were included after Lynch listened to their 1995 debut album Herzeleid while exploring locations for the film. The track "Insensatez", an instrumental version of the bossa nova song "How Insensitive" by Antônio Carlos Jobim, was also included as part of the film's soundtrack. The album, which was released on November 26, 1996, reached No. 7 on the Billboard 200 chart and was certified Gold status in the US.

Themes
Although Lost Highway is generally classified as a neo-noir film, the film borrows elements from other genres, including German Expressionism and French New Wave. The terms psychological thriller and horror film have also been used to describe its narrative elements. Writing for the Australian Metro Magazine, Thomas Caldwell described Fred Madison as "a typical film noir hero, inhabiting a doomed and desolate world characterised by an excess of sexuality, darkness and violence." Another film noir feature that is present in the film is the femme fatale (Alice Wakefield), who misleads Pete Dayton into dangerous situations. The film was also noted for its graphic violence and sexual themes. Lynch defended these images, stating that he was simply being honest with his own ideas for the film.

Some of the film's themes and ideas had been explored before: the 1945 film Detour also focuses on a disturbed nightclub musician. The film's setting and mysterious recorded messages were seen as a reference to the 1955 film Kiss Me Deadly, while its nightmarish atmosphere has been compared to Maya Deren's 1943 short film Meshes of the Afternoon. Like Alfred Hitchcock's 1958 film Vertigo, the film examines male obsessions with women, who merely represent emotions that relate to them. Lynch has described the film as a "psychogenic fugue" and insisted that, while Lost Highway is about "identity", the film is very abstract and can be interpreted in different ways. He does not favor advancing a specific interpretation and said that the film leaves viewers to interpret events as they choose. Gifford, however, thinks that the film offers a rational explanation to its surreal events. According to him, Fred Madison is experiencing a psychogenic fugue, which is manifested when he transforms into Pete. Some viewers think that the film is a homage to Ambrose Bierce's 1890 short story "An Occurrence at Owl Creek Bridge".

The film's circular narrative has been likened to a Möbius strip. Cultural critic Slavoj Žižek felt that this circularity is analogous to a psychoanalytic process. According to him, "there is a symptomatic key phrase (as in all of Lynch's films) that always returns as an insistent, traumatic, and indecipherable message (the Real), and there is a temporal loop, as with analysis, where the protagonist at first fails to encounter the self, but in the end is able to pronounce the symptom consciously as his own." This implies that Fred's madness is so powerful that even the fantasy where he sees himself as Pete ultimately dissolves and ends in a nightmare. He also interprets the film's bipartite structure as exploiting "the opposition of two horrors: the phantasmatic horror of the nightmarish noir universe of perverse sex, betrayal, and murder, and the (perhaps much more unsettling) despair of our drab, alienated daily life of impotence and distrust."

Release

Box office

Lost Highway was released in France on January 15, 1997. The film received its North American premiere at the Sundance Film Festival in Park City, Utah, in January 1997. The film was then given a limited release on February 21, 1997 in 12 theaters, grossing nearly $213,000 at the US box office weekend. The film expanded a week later in 212 theaters and, after a modest three-week run, went on to make $3.7 million in North America. Lost Highway was released in Russia on May 19, 2017 and grossed $28,347. Overall, the film grossed nearly $3.8 million worldwide.

Critical reception
Upon release, Lost Highway received mixed reviews from critics. Both Gene Siskel and Roger Ebert gave the film "two thumbs down", a rating Lynch would later tout as "two more great reasons to see" Lost Highway. Ebert argued that, while Lynch effectively puts images on the screen and uses a strong soundtrack to create mood, the film does not make sense, concluding that Lost Highway "is about design, not cinema". Similarly, Kenneth Turan of the Los Angeles Times wrote that Lost Highway is a "beautifully made but emotionally empty" film that "exists only for the sensation of its provocative moments". Both Stephanie Zacharek of Salon and Owen Gleiberman of Entertainment Weekly felt that the film was very superficial, especially when compared to Blue Velvet. Zacharek said that Lynch "traded some of his disturbing originality for noir formula and schticky weirdness", while Gleiberman compared the film's sex scenes to those of "mediocre Hollywood thrillers".

In a more positive review, The New York Times journalist Janet Maslin felt that, while the film's perversity is unoriginal and resembles that of Blue Velvet, Lost Highway still "holds sinister interest of its own" and "invites its audience to ponder". Metro editor Richard von Busack praised Lost Highway as a "true horror" film due to its confusing and unpleasant screenplay. He explained that horror "ought to transcend logic and ordinary reality" and, unlike with popular horror films like Scream (1996), where the difference between screen violence and real violence is obvious, Lynch "present[s] horror as horror, willing to baffle us, willing to wound us". In another positive review, Andy Klein of the Dallas Observer felt that Lost Highway was a return to form for Lynch and considered it his best work since Blue Velvet. Klein compared the film's unanswerable concerns to the "Star Gate" sequence from 2001: A Space Odyssey (1968), stating that Lost Highway is "better absorbed and experienced than analyzed".

Writing for the Chicago Reader, critic Jonathan Rosenbaum felt that Lost Highway was "an audacious move away from conventional narrative and back toward the formal beauty of Eraserhead". He credited Lynch's "masterful and often powerful fusions of sound and image" for giving the film a very expressionist style. However, he criticized the noir iconography for its lack of historical context. For example, he explained that, while Arquette's clothes fit in a noir setting, The Mystery Man's video camera is very contemporary and feels out of place. Todd McCarthy of Variety concluded that, although Lost Highway is "uneven and too deliberately obscure in meaning to be entirely satisfying", the result "remains sufficiently intriguing and startling to bring many of Lynch's old fans back on board".

At the 1997 Stinkers Bad Movie Awards, Lost Highway was nominated for Worst Picture and Worst Director, but lost to Batman & Robin in both categories. At the 1998 Belgian Film Critics Association, the film was nominated for the Grand Prix award, but lost to Lone Star.

Home media
Lost Highway was released on DVD on March 25, 2008, by Universal Studios Home Entertainment. The DVD is presented in anamorphic widescreen in the 2.35:1 ratio with Dolby Digital 5.1 audio. The film was then released on Blu-ray format in France in 2010, and in Japan and the United Kingdom in 2012. The British edition includes a collection of short, experimental films that Lynch had previously sold on his website. However, it was encoded in 1080i resolution at a 50 Hz frame rate, as opposed to the 1080p resolution at 24 frames per second of the French and Japanese editions. In the United States, Lost Highway was released on Blu-ray on June 25, 2019, by Kino Lorber using the 2010 master. Lynch did not participate in the release, saying that "It was made from old elements and not from a restoration of the original negative. I hope that a version from the restoration of the original negative will happen as soon as possible." Kino Lorber responded saying the release was sourced from the Universal Pictures master, and they had intended to work with Lynch on the release but "sent email after email without one response". The Criterion Collection announced that a 4K Blu-ray with restoration supervised and approved by Lynch would be released on October 11, 2022.

Legacy
Although not as universally praised as other Lynch films, Lost Highway has retrospectively attracted critical praise and scholarly interest. On review aggregator Rotten Tomatoes, the film has an approval rating of 68% based on 56 reviews, with an average rating of 6.4 out of 10. The website's critical consensus reads, "Marking a further escalation in David Lynch's surrealist style, Lost Highway is a foreboding mystery that arguably leads to a dead end, although it is signposted throughout with some of the director's most haunting images yet." On Metacritic, the film holds a score of 53 out of 100 based on 21 reviews, indicating "mixed or average reviews". Jeremiah Kipp of Slant Magazine claimed that the film was not an artistic failure, stating that "in many ways, it's Lynch at his most daring, emotional, and personal". 

Writing for Little White Lies, William Carroll considered the film a prelude to Mulholland Drive due to its "Los Angeles' iconic topography", and felt that it deserves to be regarded as one of the director's best works. Similarly, Daily Vanguard editor Victoria Castellanos remarked that the film "serves as a wonderful companion to Mulholland Drive and Inland Empire, and in many ways is more surreal and emotional than some of Lynch's other films".

As a cult film, Lost Highway was included in The A.V. Clubs "The New Cult Canon" section. Editor Scott Tobias viewed it as "more cohesive than it might appear at first blush", and argued that Lynch "goes digging for truths that people don't know or won't acknowledge about themselves—within dreams, within the subconscious, within those impossibly dark hallways where we fear to tread". Lucia Bozzola of the AllMovie online database claimed that, after Fire Walk With Me, Lost Highway marked an artistic and cinematic comeback for Lynch and that it remains "a sound/image tour de force". 

Lost Highway received five votes in the 2012 Sight & Sound critics' poll of The Greatest Films of All Time, ranking 323rd.

Adaptation
In 2003, the film was adapted as an opera by the Austrian composer Olga Neuwirth, with a libretto by Elfriede Jelinek.

References

External links

 
 
 

1997 films
1997 independent films
American independent films
1990s English-language films
Films directed by David Lynch
Films scored by Angelo Badalamenti
Films set in Los Angeles
Films shot in California
Films shot in Los Angeles
English-language French films
French independent films
American neo-noir films
American nonlinear narrative films
Films with screenplays by David Lynch
Uxoricide in fiction
Films adapted into operas
American avant-garde and experimental films
1990s avant-garde and experimental films
Surrealist films
1990s American films
1990s French films